The Swamp–Meadow Cabin (west) is in North Cascades National Park, in the U.S. state of Washington. Constructed sometime in the early 1910s by the North Coast Mining and Milling Company, the cabin was a warm season residence used by company employees for storage and residence while working their mining claims on Thunder Creek. The -story cabin was constructed plainly of  round hewn logs, square notched at the corners. Swamp–Meadow Cabin (west) is near Swamp–Meadow Cabin (east), and both were placed on the National Register of Historic Places in 1989.

References

Houses on the National Register of Historic Places in Washington (state)
Houses completed in 1912
Buildings and structures in Skagit County, Washington
National Register of Historic Places in North Cascades National Park
1912 establishments in Washington (state)
Log cabins in the United States
National Register of Historic Places in Skagit County, Washington
Log buildings and structures on the National Register of Historic Places in Washington (state)